Koštabona is a village in the City Municipality of Koper in the Littoral region of Slovenia.

Name
Koštabona was attested in written sources in 1620 as Costabuona, and in 1763–87 as Costabona. The Slovene name Koštabona is borrowed from Italian. The name is a compound of costa 'slope' and bona 'good, fertile', referring to its physical location on a fertile promontory.

Another theory, based on oral tradition, claims that in Late Antiquity Koštabona was the site of a Roman fortress named Castrum Bonae guarding the trade route through the Dragonja Valley, and that the name is derived from this. However, Italian has no co- reflex derived from this noun (cf. Italian castellum 'castle'), and the expected Italian reflex of Latin castrum would be **castro, not costa (cf. Latin astrum > Italian astro 'star', Latin rastrum > Italian rastro 'rake', etc.).

History
Koštabona stands on a hill above the Dragonja River. Archaeological evidence shows that the site was inhabited in prehistoric times.

Churches
The parish church in the settlement is dedicated to Saints Cosmas and Damian. There is also a small church dedicated to the Blessed Deacon Elias (said to be a disciple of Saint Hermagoras) and a cemetery church dedicated to Saint Andrew.

References

External links

Koštabona on Geopedia

Populated places in the City Municipality of Koper